Positive action is the promotion of an under-represented group without prejudicing the criteria of selection by merit.

Positive action may also refer to:
Positive Action, a series of political protests and strikes in pre-independence Ghana
Positive Action Group, a political pressure group based in the Isle of Man
Affirmative action or positive action, policies that take race, color, religion, sex or national origin into consideration

See also
Positive (disambiguation)
Positive affectivity, the psychological capability to respond positively
Positive liberty, having the power and resources to act to fulfill one's own potential